Osmia adae is a species of bees within the genus Osmia, also known as mason bees, in the Megachilidae family.

It was described by British entomologist Charles Thomas Bingham in 1897.

Osmia adae are largely found in Northern India.

References 

adae
Insects of India
Insects described in 1897